Le Rœulx Castle, also known as the Château des Princes de Croÿ, or "castle of the Princes de Croÿ", is a castle in the town of Le Rœulx in the province of Hainaut, Wallonia, Belgium.

See also
List of castles in Belgium
House of Croÿ

External links
Castle of Le Roeulx, Belgian Tourist office Wallonia, Brussels
Chateau du Roeulx, www.chateauxduhainaut.be

Wallonia's Major Heritage
Castles in Belgium
Castles in Hainaut (province)